San Francisco de Asís Parish is a Catholic parish church in San Francisco Coacalco, in the municipality of Coacalco de Berriozábal, State of Mexico. It is dedicated to Francis of Assisi, whose feast is on 4 October. The church was opened  and was rebuilt . It is part of the Roman Catholic Diocese of Cuautitlán. The facade is a mixture of late baroque and early neoclassical styles.

References

External links

The Parish Official Facebook Account

Coacalco de Berriozábal
1580 establishments in North America
Baroque church buildings in Mexico
Franciscan churches in Mexico
Roman Catholic churches in Mexico
Spanish Colonial architecture in Mexico
Neoclassical church buildings in Mexico